Ulf Olav Johanson (also credited as Johnason and Johansson) (3 February 1922, in Stockholm – 15 February 1990, in Stockholm) was a Swedish actor. He won the Eugene O'Neill Award in 1983.

Selected filmography

 Hans majestäts rival (1943) - Royal Guard (uncredited)
 Crisis (1946) - Piano Player (uncredited)
 Det glada kalaset (1946) - Policeman
 It Rains on Our Love (1946) - Stålvispen
 Music in Darkness (1948) - Man Waiting for Train (uncredited)
 Singoalla (1949) - Messenger on Horse (uncredited)
 Number 17 (1949) - Henry
 Regementets ros (1950) - Doctor
 She Came Like the Wind (1952) - Listmannen
 Bom the Flyer (1952) - Captain (uncredited)
 Barabbas (1953) - Josef from Arimatea (uncredited)
 The Road to Klockrike (1953) - Kvarvarande arbetslös svensk (uncredited)
 Bill Bergson and the White Rose Rescue (1953) - Peters
 Stupid Bom (1953) - Nilsson
 Our Father and the Gypsy (1954) - Axel Axelsson (uncredited)
 Hjälpsamma herrn (1954) - Larsson
Taxi 13 (1954) - Quarrelsome Man
 Flicka utan namn (1954) - Granne
 Ung sommar (1954)
 Laugh Bomb (1954) - Police Commissioner
 Mord, lilla vän (1955) - Olle Sivert
 Smiles of a Summer Night (1955) - Legal Clerk (uncredited)
 The Light from Lund (1955) - Clergyman (uncredited)
 Night Child (1956) - Plain-clothes Policeman (uncredited)
 The Biscuit (1956) - Jacquetten (uncredited)
 The Seventh Seal (1957) - Knight Commander (uncredited)
 Mother Takes a Vacation (1957) - Jocke (uncredited)
 Wild Strawberries (1957) - Mr. Borg - Isak's Father (uncredited)
 You Are My Adventure (1958) - Professor (uncredited)
 The Jazz Boy (1958) - Belysningsmästaren på China
 Fröken Chic (1959) - Distrainer (uncredited)
 Swinging at the Castle (1959) - Sixten Fyltegård
 Heaven and Pancake (1959) - Alvar Sund
 Lyckodrömmen (1963) - Raskling
 Den gula bilen (1963) - Johansson
 Adam och Eva (1963) - Engineer
 Wild West Story (1964) - Doodle
 All These Women (1964) - Man in Black (uncredited)
 Loving Couples (1964) - Lawyer (uncredited)
 ...för vänskaps skull... (1965) - Editor-in-chief
 Hej du glada sommar!!! (1965) - Bror Väster
 Myten (1966) - Boman
 Adamsson i Sverige (1966) - Salvation Colonel Andersson
 Tofflan (1967) - Doctor
 Hour of the Wolf (1968) - Heerbrand
 Shame (1968) - Läkaren i förhörslokalen
 Het snö (1968) - Lasse
 Ett möte på Kretjetovkastationen (1970, TV Movie) - Tveritinov
 Den vita stenen (1973, TV Series) - Häradshövdingen
 A Handful of Love (1974) - Technical manager
 En enkel melodi (1974) - Felix's Father
 The Magic Flute (1975, TV Movie) - Andra prästen
 Face to Face (1976) - Helmuth Wankel
 Man måste ju leva... (1978) - Arvid
 Henrietta (1983) - Greven, markägare
 Sommarkvällar på jorden (1987) - Fredrik

External links

1922 births
1990 deaths
Swedish male stage actors
Swedish male film actors
Male actors from Stockholm
Eugene O'Neill Award winners
Litteris et Artibus recipients
20th-century Swedish male actors